Assembly elections were held in Indian state of West Bengal to elect the members of West Bengal Legislative Assembly . The election took place in five phases between 17 April and 8 May. The votes were counted three days later on May 11, 2006, and, thanks to the electronic voting machines, all the results were out by the end of the day.

The Communist Party of India (Marxist)-led Left Front won the election with an overwhelming majority. The previous government, formed by the Left Front and led by chief minister Buddhadeb Bhattacharjee, completed its full five-year term in office following its coming to power in 2001. The Left Front had been ruling the state of West Bengal for the last three decades, the world's longest-running democratically elected Communist government.

Election schedule

Results
Source: Indian elections

Alliance wise result

Party wise result

Total Number of constituencies  : 294 
Results declared  : 294 
Total contestants  : 1654

Elected members

See also
 Left Front Ministry in West Bengal in 2006

References

External links
 West Bangal General Legislative Election Results at the Election Commission of India 
 List of Successful candidates, constituency-wise
 West Bengal Assembly Election 2006 Results - Partywise

2006 State Assembly elections in India
State Assembly elections in West Bengal
2000s in West Bengal
May 2006 events in India